The American rock band Pinegrove has recorded songs for five studio albums, as well as three extended plays. This list comprises the band's recorded catalog, which consists of 61 songs.

Songs

Notes

References

External links
 
 

Pinegrove